The AEDC Space Chambers Test Facility, located at Arnold Engineering Development Complex, contains several test units used for simulating space conditions. The facility has a variety of test cells to accommodate various sized test articles. Test articles range in size from the sensor level all the way up to full-scale space systems. All test units in the facility are owned by the United States Air Force and currently operated by Aerospace Testing Alliance.

7V 
The 7V chamber is a deep space environment simulation test facility designed to test high performance interceptors and surveillance sensors at the conditions of deep space. The facility consists of a 7-foot-diameter by 21-foot-long chamber containing a full gaseous helium thermal shroud. The chamber is surrounded by a Class 100 Clean Room with an adjoining Class 1000 build-up area. The 7V chamber can be conditioned from atmospheric pressure to 10−7 torr.

10V 
The 10V chamber is 10-ft. diam. by 30-ft. long and capable of being conditioned  from atmospheric pressure to 10−7 torr. The test article can be placed in a class 100 clean room while the rest of the facility is housed in a class 10,000 clean room. The chamber itself is designed for testing space senors that look at various objects against the dark sky.

Mark 1 
The Mark 1 Test Facility is a 42-foot-diameter by 82-foot space simulation chamber for full-scale space systems testing. The chamber can be conditioned from atmospheric pressure to 5x10−7 torr. The chamber can support test articles up to 200,000 pounds

See also 
Arnold Air Force Base
Vacuum chamber
Spaceflight

References

External links 
Arnold Engineering Development Center (official)

Centers of the United States Air Force